New Cross Fire Station is a Grade II listed building at 266 Queens Road, New Cross, London.

It was built in 1893–94 and the architect was Robert Pearsall.

George Arthur Roberts, founder and pioneer of the discussion and education groups of the fire service, was stationed here during World War II.

References

Grade II listed buildings in the London Borough of Lewisham
Grade II listed government buildings
Fire stations completed in 1894
Fire stations in the United Kingdom
Buildings by Robert Pearsall
New Cross